The 1956 UC Riverside Highlanders football team represented the University of California, Riverside as an independent during the 1956 NCAA College Division football season. Led by first-year head coach Carl Selin, UC Riverside compiled a record of 1–6. The team was outscored by its opponents 251 to 44 for the season. The Highlanders played home games at UCR Athletic Field in Riverside, California.

Schedule

References

UC Riverside
UC Riverside Highlanders football seasons
UC Riverside Highlanders football